Georges Hector Pharand (born December 2, 1868) was an Ontario businessman and political figure. He represented Prescott in the Legislative Assembly of Ontario from 1908 to 1911 as a Conservative member.

He was born in Saint-Clet, Quebec in 1868, the son of Jean-Baptiste Pharand. He married Ariella Lapointe in 1891. He was a merchant at L'Orignal, Ontario and a land agent for the Canadian Pacific Railway. He defeated Louis-Joseph Labrosse in 1908 and was defeated by Gustave Évanturel in 1911; he was also unsuccessful in the 1914 provincial election.

References 
 Histoire des Comtes Unis de Prescott et de Russell, L. Brault (1963)

External links 

1868 births
Franco-Ontarian people
Progressive Conservative Party of Ontario MPPs
Year of death missing